Samuel Harrington Littell (November 6, 1873 – November 15, 1967) was bishop of what is now the Episcopal Diocese of Hawaii from 1930 to 1942. He was consecrated on February 27, 1930.

Early life
Littell was born on November 6, 1873 in Wilmington, Delaware to Thomas Gardiner Littell and Helen Arcadia Harrington. He was awarded his B.A. from Trinity College in 1895 and graduated from General Theological Seminary with a S.T.D. in 1898. In 1898 he was ordained a deacon by the Bishop of Delaware Leighton Coleman. Following his diaconate ordination he left to serve as a missionary to China. Littell was ordained priest in 1899 by the Bishop of Shanghai, Frederick Graves. He served in China as secretary of the Lower House of the General Synod of the Church in China. He also taught at Boone College from 1898 to 1903.

Episcopacy
Littell was elected Bishop of Hawaii on November 13, 1929 at a special meeting held by the House of Bishops in Washington, D.C. He was consecrated bishop in St Andrew's Cathedral in Honolulu by Hugh L. Burleson, the Bishop of South Dakota, on February 27, 1930. His co-consecrators included the Bishop of Tokyo John McKim and Henry Bond Restarick, former Bishop of Hawaii.

As Bishop, Littell incorporated Iolani School and Molokai's Shingle Memorial Hospital. He retired and returned to the mainland in 1942.

Personal life
In 1902 Littell married Charlotte Moeller Mason, who died in 1913. On May 19, 1915 he married Evelyn Alma Taber. He had a total of 8 children, including Rev. Edward M. Littell.

He died on November 15, 1967 at St. Barnabas Hospital in New York City.

References

External links 
Genealogical newsletter notice

1873 births
1967 deaths
Episcopal bishops of Hawaii
People from Wilmington, Delaware
Trinity College (Connecticut) alumni
General Theological Seminary alumni